Jacques Villeglé, born Jacques Mahé de la Villeglé (27 March 1926 – 6 June 2022) was a French mixed-media artist and affichiste famous for his alphabet with symbolic letters and decollage with ripped or lacerated posters. He was a member of the Nouveau Réalisme art group (1960–1970). His work is primarily focused on the anonymous and on the marginal remains of civilization. The sociologist Zygmunt Bauman has qualified him as one of the most outstanding exponents of liquid art, in his work Liquid Life, together with Herman Braun-Vega and Manolo Valdés.

Biography
Villeglé first started producing art in 1947 in Saint-Malo by collecting found objects (steel wires, bricks from Saint-Malo's Atlantic retaining wall).  In December 1949, he concentrated his work on ripped advertising posters from the street.  Working with fellow artist Raymond Hains, Villeglé began to use collage and found/ripped posters from street advertisements in creating Ultra-Lettrist psychogeographical hypergraphics in the 1950s, and in June 1953, he published Hepérile Éclaté, a phonetic poem by Camille Bryen, which was made unreadable when read through strips of grooved glass made by Hains.

Posters
He built posters in which one has been placed over another or others, and the top poster or posters have been ripped, revealing to a greater or lesser degree the poster or posters underneath.

Ultra-lettrist
In February 1954, Villeglé and Hains met the Lettrism poet François Dufrêne, and this latter introduced them to Yves Klein, Pierre Restany, and Jean Tinguely.

Nouveau réalisme 
In 1958, Villeglé published an overview of his work on ripped posters, Des Réalités collectives, which is to a certain degree a prefiguration of the manifesto of the New Realism group (1960) which he joined at its inception.

Bibliography
 Poesie der Großstadt. Die Affichisten. Bernard Blistène, Fritz Emslander, Esther Schlicht, Didier Semin, Dominique Stella. Snoeck, Köln 2014,

References

External links 

 Studio of Jacques Villeglé by Marion Chanson
 A tribute to Villeglé with photos from Padova exhibition 2012 by Alain Chivilò
 Centre Pompidou, Paris Press release: Jacques Villeglé 2008
 Centre d’art contemporain de Quimper
  Jacques Villeglé
  Stiftung Ahlers Pro Arte, Hanover (German)

1926 births
2022 deaths
People from Quimper
French mixed-media artists
French poster artists
Nouveau réalisme artists
French contemporary artists
20th-century French artists
20th-century French male artists
21st-century French artists
21st-century French male artists